Cyprus participated in the Eurovision Song Contest 2007 with the song "Comme ci, comme ça" written by Dimitris Korgialas and Poseidonas Giannopoulos. The song was performed by Evridiki, who was selected by the Cypriot broadcaster Cyprus Broadcasting Corporation (CyBC) in January 2007 to represent Cyprus at the 2007 contest in Helsinki, Finland. Evridiki had previously represented Cyprus in the Eurovision Song Contest 1992 and 1994 where she both placed eleventh. The Cypriot song, "Comme ci, comme ça", was presented to the public on 23 February 2007 during the special show Cyprus 12 Points, Chypre 12 Points. This was the first time that Cyprus was represented with a song performed entirely in the French language at the Eurovision Song Contest.

Cyprus competed in the semi-final of the Eurovision Song Contest which took place on 10 May 2007. Performing during the show in position 3, "Comme ci, comme ça" was not announced among the top 10 entries of the semi-final and therefore did not qualify to compete in the final. It was later revealed that Cyprus placed fifteenth out of the 18 participating countries in the semi-final with 65 points.

Background 

Prior to the 2007 contest, Cyprus had participated in the Eurovision Song Contest twenty-four times since their debut in the 1981 contest. Its best placing was fifth, which it achieved three times: in the 1982 competition with the song "Mono i agapi" performed by Anna Vissi, in the 1997 edition with "Mana mou" performed by Hara and Andreas Constantinou, and the 2004 contest with "Stronger Every Minute" performed by Lisa Andreas. Cyprus' least successful result was in the 1986 contest when it placed last with the song "Tora zo" by Elpida, receiving only four points in total. However, its worst finish in terms of points received was when it placed second to last in the 1999 contest with "Tha'nai erotas" by Marlain Angelidou, receiving only two points.

The Cypriot national broadcaster, Cyprus Broadcasting Corporation (CyBC), broadcasts the event within Cyprus and organises the selection process for the nation's entry. Cyprus has used various methods to select the Cypriot entry in the past, such as internal selections and televised national finals to choose the performer, song or both to compete at Eurovision. In 2006, the broadcaster organised a national final to select the Cypriot entry. However, CyBC opted to select the 2007 Cypriot entry via an internal selection, a method which was last used by the broadcaster in 2003.

Before Eurovision

Internal selection 
On 26 January 2007, CyBC announced that they had internally selected Evridiki to represent Cyprus in Helsinki. Evridiki previously represented Cyprus at the Eurovision Song Contest in 1992 and 1994 where she placed eleventh on both occasions with the songs "Teriazoume" and "Ime anthropos ki ego", respectively. Her contest song, "Comme ci, comme ça", was written by Dimitris Korgialas and Poseidonas Giannopoulos, and is the first Cypriot entry in the contest to be performed entirely in the French language.

"Comme ci, comme ça" was presented to the public on 23 February 2007 during the special show Cyprus 12 Points, Chypre 12 Points, which took place at the CyBC Studio 3 in Nicosia, hosted by Marina Filippidou and Giannis Charalampous and broadcast on RIK 1 and RIK Sat as well as online via the broadcaster's website cybc.cy. In addition to the song presentation, the show featured guest performances by 2007 Belarusian Eurovision entrant Dmitry Koldun, 2007 Maltese Eurovision entrant Olivia Lewis, 2007 Polish Eurovision entrants The Jet Set and 2007 Romanian Eurovision entrant Todomondo. The official preview video for "Comme ci, comme ça", directed by White Room, was filmed on 5 March 2007 in Athens, Greece, and presented on 10 March 2007 during the CyBC evening news broadcast.

Promotion 
Evridiki made several appearances across Europe to specifically promote "Comme ci, comme ça" as the Cypriot Eurovision entry. On 28 February, Evridiki performed "Comme ci, comme ça" during the Greek Eurovision national final. On 20 and 21 March, Evridiki performed during the MITT International Tourism Exhibition which was held at the Expocentre Fairgrounds in Moscow, Russia. Evridiki also took part in promotional activities in Belarus where she appeared during the BTRC morning programme Dobrai Ranitsy, Belarus on 22 March. On 20 April, Evridiki performed during the 12 Points Party DeLuxe event which was held at the Noorderterras in Antwerp, Belgium. Evridiki completed promotional activities in the United Kingdom between 21 and 23 April, which included a performance at the Club Palace in London on 22 April.

At Eurovision
According to Eurovision rules, all nations with the exceptions of the host country, the "Big Four" (France, Germany, Spain and the United Kingdom) and the ten highest placed finishers in the 2006 contest are required to qualify from the semi-final on 10 May 2007 in order to compete for the final on 12 May 2007. On 12 March 2007, a special allocation draw was held which determined the running order for the semi-final. Cyprus was drawn to perform in position 3, following the entry from Israel and before the entry from Belarus.

Both the semi-final and the final were broadcast in Cyprus on RIK 1 and RIK SAT with commentary by Vaso Komninou. The Cypriot spokesperson, who announced the Cypriot votes during the final, was Giannis Charalampous.

Semi-final 

Evridiki took part in technical rehearsals on 3 and 5 May, followed by dress rehearsals on 9 and 10 May. The Cypriot performance featured Evridiki dressed in a silver and black outfit, joined by two backing vocalists, a drummer, a keyboardist and a guitarist. During the performance, Evridiki raised her microphone and performed robotic dance movements. The LED screens displayed white and blue patterns, while pyrotechnic effects were also featured for the performance. The backing vocalists that joined Evridiki on stage were Froso Stilianou and Marianna Gerasimidou, while the musicians were Dimitris Horianopoulos, the co-composer of "Comme ci, comme ça" Dimitris Korgialas, and Giannis Skoutaris.

At the end of the show, Cyprus was not announced among the top 10 entries in the semi-final and therefore failed to qualify to compete in the final. It was later revealed that Cyprus placed fifteenth in the semi-final, receiving a total of 65 points.

Voting 
Below is a breakdown of points awarded to Cyprus and awarded by Cyprus in the second semi-final and grand final of the contest. The nation awarded its 12 points to Bulgaria in the semi-final and to Greece in the final of the contest.

Points awarded to Cyprus

Points awarded by Cyprus

References

2007
Countries in the Eurovision Song Contest 2007
Eurovision